Kavishari or kavishri is a style of folk music entailing energetic and dynamic a cappella singing. It was originated in the Malwa region of Punjab as a sung form of "Chhand-Baddh" kavita (poetry)

A performer or writer of kavishari is known as a kavishar. Kavishari is usually performed in melas, weddings, diwaans (religious functions), harvest celebrations (i.e. Visakhi) and mehfils etc.

History
Kavishari was started/invented by the 10th Sikh Guru, "Guru Gobind Singh Sahib". There was a need of a particular singing style or genre that can gave energy to the war-fighters. So the Kavishari was mostly sung about Bravery, known as Veer Ras, one of the nine Ras' (English: "flavour"/"subgenre") of the genre.

Characteristics 
Kavishar Word is Made of Two Words "Kavi+Shayar", Where Kavi Means Singer and Shayar Means Writer. So Kavishar Means Who Writes and Sing the Kavishari(Poetry). Kavishari is based on vocal and wording/lyrics. Singing style is its voice, Chhand is its body and the Ras (flavour) is its soul. Many kind of Chhands are used in kavishari. A noted kavishar of Punjab, Babu Rajab Ali, used some rare Chhands like Manohar Bhavani Chhand and gave some new Chhands like Bahattar Kala Chhand to kavishari as well as Punjabi literature.

There are nine accepted Ras as (subgenres) of kavishari, out of which the most commonly known four are:

 Veer Ras (Heroic)
 Shant Ras (Soulful or peaceful)
 Vairag Ras (Mystic)
 Haas Ras (Comic)

It was the Veer Ras that is most commonly sung today and specially for the need of which the genre was created.

Notable kavishars 
Notable kavishars includes:

Malwa's kavishar

 Babu Rajab Ali
 Karnail Singh Paras
  Bhai Maghi Singh Gill (Gill khurd , Bathinda)
 Bhai Bhagwan Singh (Mehraj Wale)
 Gurdev Singh Sahoke
 Kishor Chand (Baddowali)
 Sukhwinder Singh Sutantar (Pakka Kalan)
 Kavishar Harnam Singh freedom fighter(Ghanauli Dist: Ropar)

Majha's kavishar

 Bapu Bali Singh Gadiwind Gurdial Singh P. Mohan Singh Jarnail Singh SabhraJagir Singh MastJoga Singh JogiGurmukh Singh JohalDalbir Singh Gill''

Bapu Bali Singh is known to be the father of the kavishari of Majha and Joga Singh Jogi is one of the notable kavishars of Majha. Jagir Singh Mast, another famous kavishar formed the original Jagowala jatha along with Nirmal Singh Chohla, Jarnail Singh and Sulakhan Singh.

See also
 Babu Rajab Ali
 Dhadi (music)
 Folk music of Punjab

References

External links
 Download kavishari by various kavishars - www.dhadikavishr.com
 Download kavishari by Joga Singh Jogi - www.beatofindia.com

Punjabi culture
Punjabi music
History of Sikhism